The word preserve may refer to:

Common uses

 Fruit preserves, a type of sweet spread or condiment

 Nature reserve, an area of importance for wildlife, flora, fauna or other special interest, usually protected

Arts, entertainment, and media
 Preserve, a 2004 compilation involving the band Wow & Flutter
 "Preserve", a 2013 season 2 episode of The Mind of a Chef

Other uses
 Preserve (company), an American sustainable consumer goods company
 Preserve (horse), a British Thoroughbred racehorse

See also
Food preservation
Preservation (disambiguation)
Protection (disambiguation)